William M. Tugman State Park is a state park in the U.S. state of Oregon.

Tugman Park has 94 campsites for recreational vehicles (RVs) as well as 16 yurts for hikers and bikers; a day-use area, a boat ramp, a fishing dock, and a hiking trail. Activities on or near the lake include fishing, swimming, boating, and wildlife watching. The lake supports populations of largemouth bass, crappie, stocked rainbow trout, steelhead (sea-run rainbow trout), and Coho salmon, the latter of which must be released if caught.

William M. Tugman (1894–1961) was a journalist from Eugene and Reedsport. In 1957, he became the first chairman of the OPRD Advisory Committee, which made recommendations to the governor about state parks.

See also
 List of Oregon state parks

References

State parks of Oregon
Parks in Coos County, Oregon
Parks in Douglas County, Oregon